Javier is the Spanish spelling of the masculine name Xavier.

The name derives from the Catholic saint called Francis de Xavier, where Xavier refers to the saint's birthplace. This birthplace name, in turn, has Basque roots, etymologically originating in the word etxaberri (etxe berri in standard spelling), meaning "castle" or "new house".

The original place name went through a Romance phonetic change in Navarro-Aragonese, a Romance language spoken in the neighbouring Romanzado (cf. Leire) from the Early Middle Ages. Like examples can be found in Irunberri > Lumbier, Erronkari > Roncal. It was later borrowed by Castilian. Other variations of this name include Xaverius, Xever, Javiero, and Saverio. The feminine names Javiera, Saveria, Zaviera, and Saverina are less common.

Etxeberria, Echeverría, Echevarría, Etxebarri, and Chávarri are Basque surnames related to the name by etymology.

Its diffusion is due to the fame of Jesuit priest and missionary Saint Francis Xavier. When he was canonized, places and people were named after him, which popularized the name.

Contemporary use of the name Javier is found in Spain, Equatorial Guinea and Latin American countries, where it is popular.

Etymology: from Etxaberri to Javier 
 Loss of the initial e
 Loss of the ending i
 Middle, accentuated, e became the diphthongized form 
 Old Spanish X was pronounced  as in Basque, like an English sh. Old Spanish  then merged with J (then pronounced the English and later the French way) into , which is now spelled J and pronounced like Scottish or German ch or as English h.

Pronunciation 
In the English-speaking world, especially in the British media, the pronunciation of "Javier" is frequently confused with the pronunciation of French words or names ending in "-ier" such as Xavier or Olivier. The resulting pronunciation "HAV-ee-ay" is a hybrid of Spanish, French and English. In Spanish, correctly spoken, the final syllable sounds much like the English word "air", not the English word "eh".

English speakers sometimes pronounce "Xavier" as "zavier". The latter pronunciation is used for the fictional character Charles Xavier, leader of the X-Men; however it is not incorrect to pronounce it this way when considering that many 'X' words derive in English from the Greek phonetics, which pronounce it as a soft 'Ks' sound.

In other languages 
  Aragonese Chabier
  Asturian: Xabel
  Basque: Xabier
  Castilian: Javier
  Catalan Xavier
  English: Xavier 
  French: Xavier
  Gaeilge: Savy
  Galician: Xabier
  German: Xaver 
  Italian: Saviero or Saverio
  Latin: Xaverius
  Maltese: Saverju
  Leonese: Xabiere
  Philippine languages: Javier or Xavier
  Polish: Ksawery
  Portuguese: Xavier
  Russian: Ксаверий (Ksavierij)

References

External links 
 http://www.medievalscotland.org/problem/names/xavier.shtml

See also
Javy
Javier (surname)

Spanish masculine given names